Pointe d'Archeboc (3,272 m), is a mountain of the Graian Alps on the border between Aosta Valley, Italy and Savoie, France.

A popular peak for ski mountaineering, the Archeboc is a long ridge with three different summits. It is usually climbed from the Valgrisenche side in Italy.

References

Mountains of the Graian Alps
Alpine three-thousanders
Mountains of Savoie
Mountains of Aosta Valley